The SPARCstation, SPARCserver and SPARCcenter product lines are a series of SPARC-based computer workstations and servers in desktop, desk side (pedestal) and rack-based form factor configurations, that were developed and sold by Sun Microsystems.

The first SPARCstation was the SPARCstation 1 (also known as the Sun 4/60), introduced in 1989. The series was very popular and introduced the Sun-4c architecture, a variant of the Sun-4 architecture previously introduced in the Sun 4/260. Thanks in part to the delay in the development of more modern processors from Motorola, the SPARCstation series was very successful across the entire industry. The last model bearing the SPARCstation name was the SPARCstation 4. The workstation series was replaced by the Sun Ultra series in 1995; the next Sun server generation was the Sun Enterprise line introduced in 1996.

Models 
Desktop and deskside SPARCstations and SPARCservers of the same model number were essentially identical systems, the only difference being that systems designated as servers were usually "headless" (that is, configured without a graphics card and monitor), and were sold with a "server" rather than a "desktop" OS license. For example, the SPARCstation 20 and SPARCserver 20 were almost identical in motherboard, CPU, case design and most other hardware specifications.

Most desktop SPARCstations and SPARCservers shipped in either "pizzabox" or "lunchbox" enclosures, a significant departure from earlier Sun and competing systems of the time. The SPARCstation 1, 2, 4, 5, 10 and 20 were "pizzabox" machines. The SPARCstation SLC and ELC were integrated into Sun monochrome monitor enclosures, and the SPARCstation IPC, IPX, SPARCclassic, SPARCclassic X and SPARCstation LX were "lunchbox" machines.

SPARCserver models ending in "30" or "70" were housed in deskside pedestal enclosures (respectively 5-slot and 12-slot VMEbus chassis); models ending in "90" and the SPARCcenter 2000 came in rackmount cabinet enclosures. The SPARCserver 1000's design was a large rack-mountable desktop unit.

Later versions of the SPARCstation series, such as the SPARCstation 10 and 20, could be configured as multiprocessor systems as they were based on the MBus high-speed bus. These systems could accept one or two single or dual central processing units packaged in MBus modules.

Until the launch of the SPARCserver 600MP series, all SPARCstation/server models were also assigned Sun 4-series model numbers. Later models received S-prefix model numbers.

Models are listed within their category in approximately chronological order.

"Pizzabox" systems

"Lunchbox" systems

Integrated monitor/portable systems

Server systems 

Note that the above configurations were those supported by Sun Microsystems. Various third-party processor upgrades were available for SPARCstation/server systems, for instance the 80 MHz Weitek POWER μP for the SPARCstation 2 or IPX, or the Ross hyperSPARC MBus modules rated at clock speeds up to 200 MHz. As mentioned above, some models listed as SPARCstations were also available in SPARCserver configuration and vice versa.

The CS6400 was developed by an outside group working cooperatively with, rather than competitively against, Sun Microsystems; as a result, although sold by Cray Research as the Cray Superserver 6400, all of its components had Sun OEM part numbers and the machine was documented in Sun's System Handbook. In 1996, when Cray Research was bought by Silicon Graphics, the CS6400 development group was sold to Sun, and released the 64-processor Sun Ultra Enterprise 10000 "Starfire" the following year.

References

External links
Sun Microsystems
The Sun Hardware Reference, Part 1
Benchmarks for various Sun systems
Obsolyte! - Fan site for old Unix Workstations, including Sun machines
Sun Field Engineer Handbook, 20th edition

Sun servers
Sun workstations
Computer workstations
SPARC microprocessor products
Computer-related introductions in 1989
32-bit computers